The Voice: Neon Dreams was a planned live concert project organized by the American television series The Voice, announced in 2017 to open in the second quarter of 2018. It was to be held at the Hard Rock Hotel & Casino in Las Vegas, and feature a select cast of Voice stars, performing songs of various genres. In October 2018, it was announced the show would not go ahead. The project's website domain was later put up for auction by GoDaddy and bought by VooBeauty, which announced plans to turn it into an independent magazine about stars and actors living in Las Vegas.

Planned participants
Chris Mann (Team Christina Aguilera from season 2, finished in fourth place)
Matt McAndrew (Team Adam Levine from season 7, declared a runner-up)
Alisan Porter (Team Christina Aguilera from season 10 and season winner) 
Michael Sanchez (Team Alicia Keys from season 11)
Mary Sarah (Team Blake Shelton from season 10)
Matthew Schuler (Team Christina Aguilera from season 5)
Chloe Kohanski (Team Blake Shelton from season 13 and season winner)

References

External links
Official planned The Voice Vegas domain

The Voice (American TV series)
Hard Rock Hotel and Casino (Las Vegas)